The First Time on the Grass (and known in the United States as Love Under the Elms) is a 1974 Italian drama film directed by Gianluigi Calderone. It was entered into the 25th Berlin International Film Festival.

Cast
 Anne Heywood as Margherita
 Mark Lester as Franz 
 Claudio Cassinelli as Hans
 Monica Guerritore as Lotte 
 Giovanna Di Bernardo
 Bruno Zanin
 Vincenzo Ferro
 Janine Samona
 Anna Waidmann
 Giuseppe Winkler
 Lorenzo Piani

References

External links

1974 films
Italian drama films
1970s Italian-language films
1974 drama films
Films with screenplays by Vincenzo Cerami
Films scored by Fiorenzo Carpi
Films directed by Gianluigi Calderone
1970s Italian films